The 2022 AFF Futsal Championship was the 17th edition of the AFF Futsal Championship, organized by the ASEAN Football Federation (AFF) in the sport of futsal. The tournament was held in Bangkok, Thailand. The top three finishing teams of the tournament will qualify for the 2022 AFC Futsal Asian Cup in Kuwait as AFF's representatives.

Thailand won the tournament for the ninth time in a row after winning the final 5–3 in the penalty shootout against Indonesia.

Entrants 
There was no qualification, and all entrants advanced to the final tournament. The following 9 teams from member associations of the ASEAN Football Federation entered the tournament. Brunei came back for this tournament after 4 years of absence since their last appearance in 2018 AFF Futsal Championship.

Venue
All matches are held in Indoor Stadium Huamark, Bangkok.

Group stage 
All times are local time: UTC+7.

Group A

Group B

Knockout stage

Bracket

Semi-finals
The winner will qualify for 2022 AFC Futsal Asian Cup.

Third place match
The winner will qualify for 2022 AFC Futsal Asian Cup.

Final

Winners

Goalscorers

Qualified teams
The following teams qualified for 2022 AFC Futsal Asian Cup.

Tournament teams ranking
This table will show the ranking of teams throughout the tournament.

Broadcasting rights

References

External links 
AFF Futsal Championship 2022

AFF Futsal Championship
AFF 2022
AFF Futsal Championship
International futsal competitions hosted by Thailand
AFF Futsal Championship